Margaret Ross Griffel (born 9 July 1943) is an American musicologist and author.

Biography
Griffel graduated from High School of Music & Art, in Manhattan, New York in 1961. She earned a B.A. from Barnard College in 1965, M.A. in European and American History from Boston University in 1966, and a Ph.D. in musicology from Columbia University in 1975. She has served as the senior editor at Columbia University's Office of Publications and has done editorial work for various publishers. Her January 2018 revised edition of Operas in German: A Dictionary contains more than 4,500 entries and her December 2012 revised edition of Operas in English: A Dictionary contains 4,400.

Awards
The December 2012 revised edition of Operas in English: A Dictionary received the "Booklist Editor's Choice Award" in 2013 and the "Library Journal Best Reference" in 2012.

Works
 Operas in German: A Dictionary, published in 1990,  (paper),  (ebook); revised 2018
 Operas in English: A Dictionary, published in 2013,  (print),  (ebook)

References

External links
 

1943 births
Living people
American women musicologists
American music historians
Barnard College alumni
Boston University alumni
Columbia University alumni
Fiorello H. LaGuardia High School alumni
Writers from New York City
Historians from New York (state)
American women historians
20th-century American musicologists
20th-century American historians
20th-century American women writers
21st-century American musicologists
21st-century American historians
21st-century American women writers